The 1987 NAIA Division I football season was the 32nd season of college football sponsored by the NAIA, was the 18th season of play of the NAIA's top division for football.

The season was played from August to November 1987 and culminated in the 1987 NAIA Champion Bowl playoffs and the 1987 NAIA Champion Bowl, played this year on December 19, 1987 at Cameron Stadium in Lawton, Oklahoma, on the campus of Cameron University.

Cameron defeated Carson–Newman in the Champion Bowl (a re-match of the previous year's final, won by the Eagles), 30–2, to win their first NAIA national title.

Conference realignment

Conference changes
 This is the final season that the NAIA officially recognizes a football champion from the Central States Intercollegiate Conference. The CSIC would play one more season as part of the NAIA before disbanding.

Conference standings

Conference champions

Postseason

Format
After nine seasons of an eight-team bracket, the tournament field expanded to sixteen. In turn, the playoffs began during the month of November for the first time since 1975.

Bracket

See also
 1987 NCAA Division I-A football season
 1987 NCAA Division I-AA football season
 1987 NCAA Division II football season
 1987 NCAA Division III football season

References

 
NAIA Football National Championship